William Walsh (born 1938) is an Irish former hurler who played as a midfielder at senior level for the Cork county team.

References

1938 births
Living people
Cork inter-county hurlers
St Finbarr's hurlers